Fálkar is the soundtrack to Falcons (Fálkar is the Icelandic word for Falcons), which was directed by Friðrik Þór Friðriksson in 2002. With 12 tracks, this album contains a variety of Icelandic artists, from Hilmar Örn Hilmarsson, who was in charge of the music composition of the soundtrack, to Mínus, Múm, and Daníel Ágúst Haraldsson (former member of Gus-Gus), among others.

Megas appears in this album with the song "Edge and Over", his first English song which counted with the accompaniment of his long-time collaborator, Guðlaugur Kristinn Óttarsson in guitars. The film protagonist, Keith Carradine is featured here with two tracks of "Northern Light", one of them instrumental.

Track listing

Credits
Music composed, arranged and produced by: Hilmar Örn Hilmarsson
Guitar: Guðlaugur Kristinn Óttarsson, Jón Þór Birgisson, Kristján Edelstein, and Orri Hardarson
Bass: Georg Bjarnason, and Tómas Magnús Tómasson
Percussion: Birgir Baldursson
Cello: Stefán Örn Arnarson
Sound Engineers: Georg Bjarnason, and Tómas Magnús Tómasson
Music recorded at the People’s Studio, Reykjavík

See also
Falcons, the movie directed by Friðrik Þór Friðriksson.

External links
Falcons at the Icelandic Film Corporation Web Site
Page about Megas at Tónlist.com
Official site of Guðlaugur Kristinn Óttarsson
Page of G. K. Óttarsson at MySpace.com
Official site of Orri Hardarson
Official site of Birgir Baldursson
Page of Tómas Magnús Tómasson - Fálkar’s sound engineer and bassist.
Official site of Múm 
Official site of Mínus
Official site of Leaves
Page about Bang Gang

Pop albums by Icelandic artists
2002 soundtrack albums
Drama film soundtracks